Valley Springs (formerly, Spring Valley and Valley Spring) is a census-designated place (CDP) in Calaveras County, California, United States, in the foothills of the Sierra Nevada Mountain Range. Valley Springs is registered as a California Historical Landmark, number 251.

History

Valley Springs was once known as Spring Valley. Because another post office was called Spring Valley in Colusa County, the name was changed to Valley Springs. The earliest settlers were Native American. The presence of grinding rocks found in Valley Springs suggests that the Mi-Wuk and the Yokuts tribes resided in Valley Springs. They gathered acorns for trade and food before returning to their home in the spring. The Mi-Wuk were later driven further into the hills due to gold miners.

The first saloon and store in the Valley Springs region opened in 1849. Thereafter, small farms and large ranches were established to provide food for settlers. Stage stops emerged along (now) Highway 26, lodging developed, and (now) Highway 12 linked roads to the surrounding areas.

A need for more affordable freight rates, expansion of tourism to Big Trees, and timber interests caused a need for a quicker mode of transport. Land sold quickly, and roads and buildings were built as settlers arrived. The railways expanded, and on April 25, 1885, the first train pulled into Valley Springs station, which was at first just a tent. Valley Springs became a center of freight distribution. Furthermore, residents could reach San Francisco in  hours, Stockton in  hours, Sacramento in 3 hours by train. A large fire burned down the majority of the central town in September 1895. Because of this fire, the lack of rail expansion to the nearby mountains, and the lofty expectations of the railroad, Valley Springs was hit hard.

Despite rebuilding the town, Valley Springs' population increase was below 1% a year. Not even the installation of electricity in 1899 and the SP rail's move to a standard-gauge line encouraged local growth. From 1910 to 1930, the population drastically decreased. In 1923, Valley Springs only had 350 residents, but 1925 had a big change with the Calaveras Cement Company's need for product transportation. The rail extended, which helped develop the Pardee Dam, as well as help in the shipment of cement directly to customers such as the Bay Area. The McClellan and Travis Air Force base, San Francisco Airport, the Central Valley dams, and the San Francisco-Oakland Bay Bridge were built due to Valley Springs and the local cement it transported.

Calaveras Cement and the construction of both the Hogan Dam and Pardee Dam increased employment. Local lumber, forest products, cement, and clay resources increased shipping needs. Agriculture still remained the main occupation of residents, whose primary agricultural focus was on grains, livestock, and small-scale wine grapes and olives. Nevertheless, Valley Spring's strategic location was key to its importance.

The 1930s and 1940s had a 6% annual population increase. Population then flattened out in the 1950s to increase again in the 1960s, largely due to the development of the Camanche Reservoir and the expansion of the Hogan Reservoir. The 1970s had population increases resulting from Rancho Calaveras, the La Contenta Golf Course, and the development of its surrounding HOA-governed homes. The doors of major manufacturing closed in the 1980s, yet Valley Springs continues to expand in population and development. For decades, it assisted in the development of major cities in the valley and the bay.

In 1885, the San Joaquin and Sierra Nevada Railroad completed a narrow-gauge railroad from Brack's Landing to Valley Springs, with an old train station known as "Kokines station". The line eventually became the property of Southern Pacific Railroad, and a standard-gauge line into Valley Springs was substituted. A post office was opened there in 1872, closed in 1879, and re-established in 1882.

Geography

Climate 

Valley Springs has a Mediterranean climate typical of the Sierra Nevada foothills. Winters are cool and wet with mild days, chilly nights, and substantial rainfall. Summers are hot and dry with very hot days, cool nights, and minimal rainfall. Due to the orographic effect, rainfall in all seasons is significantly greater than on the valley floor to the west.

Summers are typically very warm to hot, springs and falls are temperate, and winters are cool with a slight dusting of snow and/or frost. Hot, dry summers make Valley Springs fire-prone; however, three fire stations, lake water, and adequate road access assist in extinguishing fires expediently.

Demographics

Valley Springs' total population is 3,553, at 50.00% each male and female (with 1 more male than female).

Politics

Valley Springs voters are a majority Republican, about one-third Democrat, and roughly 9% independent. This is a greater percentage Republican and Independent than the United States average, and a lesser percentage Democrat.

References

External links
 

Census-designated places in Calaveras County, California
California Historical Landmarks
Census-designated places in California